Noite e Dia (Portuguese for Night and Day) is the second and last studio album by Brazilian post-punk band Smack. It was released in 1986 by Baratos Afins.

It is the only Smack release to not feature Edgard Scandurra, since he left the band in the same year in order to give more focus to his alternate band Ira!. He returned to Smack when they reunited in 2005, however. It was also the band's last release to feature Thomas Pappon, since he moved to England in the mid-1990s; he would not partake on the band's reunion.

Track listing

Personnel
 Sérgio "Pamps" Pamplona — vocals, guitar
 Thomas Pappon — drums
 Sandra Coutinho — bass

References

External links
 Noite e Dia at Discogs

1986 albums
Smack (Brazilian band) albums